John or Jack Courtney may refer to:

John Edgar Courtney (born 1934), Australian ornithologist
J. Ira Courtney (1888–1968), American athlete
John Mortimer Courtney (1838–1920), Canadian civil servant
John Courtney (MP), Member of Parliament (MP) for Bodmin
John Courtney (diarist) (1734–1806), of Beverley, Yorkshire, England
John Courtney (playwright) (1804–1865), playwright, dramatic actor and comedian
Jack Courtney (figure skater) (born 1953), American pair skater
Jack Courtney (rugby league) (1901–1948), Australian rugby league player

See also
John Courtenay (disambiguation)
Jon Courtney, singer and guitarist in British band Pure Reason Revolution
Jonathan Courtney (born 1966), Maine politician
John Courtney Murray (1904–1967), Jesuit priest, theologian, and prominent American intellectual